Hypocalymma speciosum is a member of the family Myrtaceae endemic to Western Australia.

It blooms between September and November producing pink-purple flowers.

It is found on rocky slopes in the Great Southern region of Western Australia centred around the Stirling Range where it grows in clay sand soils over laterite.

References

speciosum
Endemic flora of Western Australia
Rosids of Western Australia
Plants described in 1852
Taxa named by Nikolai Turczaninow